Blue's Moods is an album by American trumpeter Blue Mitchell recorded in 1960 and released on the Riverside label.

Reception

The Allmusic review by Scott Yanow awarded the album 4 stars and stated "the trumpeter is typically distinctive, swinging and inventive within the hard bop genre".

Track listing
All compositions by Blue Mitchell except as indicated
 "I'll Close My Eyes" (Buddy Kaye, Billy Reid) - 5:56 
 "Avars" (Rocky Boyd) - 4:07 
 "Scrapple from the Apple" (Charlie Parker) - 4:00 
 "Kinda Vague" (Wynton Kelly, Blue Mitchell) - 6:28 
 "Sir John" - 6:06 
 "When I Fall in Love" (Edward Heyman, Victor Young) - 5:42 
 "Sweet Pumpkin" (Ronnell Bright) - 4:19 
 "I Wish I Knew" (Mack Gordon, Harry Warren) - 4:26

Recorded in New York City on August 24 (tracks 5, 6 & 8) and August 25 (tracks 1-4 & 7), 1960.

Personnel
Blue Mitchell - trumpet, cornet  
Wynton Kelly - piano
Sam Jones - bass
Roy Brooks - drums

References

Riverside Records albums
Blue Mitchell albums
1960 albums
Albums produced by Orrin Keepnews